The 21st Gran Premio Lotteria di Monza, made up the 8th round of the 1979 FIA European Championship, saw the series move to Autodromo Nazionale Monza, on June 24, 1979. This race was also round 8 of the Campionato Italian.

Report

Entry
A grand total of 72 F3 cars were entered for the event. They were split into 3 groups.

Qualifying
The Italian Championship front runners took pole position for Heats 1 and 2. Piercarlo Ghinzani took the pole for the Euroracin Srl team in his March-Toyota 793 for the Heat 1; teammate, Michele Alboreto, headed the grid for Heat 2. Mike Thackwell, from the British F3 series, took the pole for  Heat 3 in his works entered as March-Toyota 793.

Heats
Each heat was held over 8 laps of the historic Monza circuit. The victor of Heat 1 was Piercarlo Ghinzani from Guido Cappellotto. Heat 2 went to another Italian, Mauro Baldi, followed by Michele Alboreto. The final heat, Heat 3, saw Mike Thackwell take the chequered flag ahead of Carlo Rossi. The Championship leader, Alain Prost, only finished 13th in Heat 1 and did not progress into the final heat.

Final
The final was held over 17 laps of the Monza circuit. Mike Thackwell was the winner for the March Engineering Ltd. team driving their March-Toyota 793. The kiwi won in a time of 32:13.33 minutes averaging a speed of 114.086 mph. Second place went to Mauro Baldi in his privately entered March-Toyota 793; he was exactly 1.1 seconds behind the winner. In third place was Michele Alboreto in his Euroracing Srl-entered March.

Classification

Final

 Fastest lap: Mike Thackwell, 1:52.50secs. (115.326 mph)

Heat 1

Roberto Campominosi (Pavesi Racing Ralt-Alfa Romeo) was disqualified from Heat 1, due to a leaking airbox.

Heat 2

Heat 3

References

FIA European Formula 3 Championship
Italian Formula Three Championship
Gran Premio della Lotteria di Monza